The Hume Cronyn Memorial Observatory is a public astronomical observatory located on the campus of the University of Western Ontario, in London, Ontario, Canada.

Brief History
When London, Ontario lawyer, businessman, and member of federal parliament Hume Blake Cronyn died in 1933, his widow, Frances Amelia Cronyn (granddaughter of John Kinder Labatt) approached the University of Western Ontario with the idea of a memorial for her late husband.  Mathematics and Astronomy professor Harold Kingston suggested that the university was interested in building an astronomical observatory. The result was the construction a new $40,000 observatory on the university campus, funded by Mrs. Cronyn, and named in honor of her late husband. The grand opening was held at 4:00pm on Tuesday, October 25, 1940.

Facilities

Building and Dome
The building is a stone structure, being 31 feet by 45 feet in horizontal dimension, made of Credit Valley Limestone, and trimmed with Indiana Sandstone. The building was designed by local architect O. Roy Moore, and built by the Putherbough Company. The dome was fabricated by Perkin Elmer Corporation in New York, shipped in pieces, and assembled on site.

Telescopes

The 254 mm refractor 

The brass refractor telescope, finders, German equatorial mount, and pier were purchased from Perkin Elmer Corporation of New York for the sum of $7500 CDN.
The objective is a crown and flint achromatic lens, the glass having been poured by Chance Brothers of England. The (then) U.S. firm Bausch and Lomb was first contracted to pour the glass for the objective lens, but because of the war effort was not able to fulfill its commitment. The best guess is that the lens was ground and polished
by Halley Mogey (private family communication), the first employee of Perkin Elmer Corporation and son of famed telescope maker William Mogey.
The telescope tube is brass, having a focal length of 4386mm, which yields a speed of f/17.2.  The telescope is fitted with 25mm and 90mm finders.

The 203 mm Schmidt camera
When the large refractor was shipped to Canada, Perkin Elmer included the Schmidt camera at no extra charge, even though it was apparently not originally ordered.
It is said that because of the war effort, Perkin Elmer was shifting its focus to military contracts and hence stopped its production of retail telescopes.
The telescope is a classic Schmidt camera, having a 203 mm diameter corrector plate, with a 300 mm diameter spherical mirror (an 8"/12" design). A small sliding door in the side of the instrument allows the loading of a circular piece of photographic film, mounted in a film holder. The provenance of this camera is presently unknown. James Gilbert Baker of Harvard University was a consultant for Perkin Elmer in 1940 in which year he developed his own version of the camera, to be known as the Baker-Schmidt camera. He may well have had his hands on this particular instrument while he was a junior fellow at Harvard University at the time Perkin Elmer was founded in 1937 incorporated in Dec. 1939)

The 300 mm Cassegrain reflector
This telescope was purchased by William H. Wehlau in 1958 and was installed onto the refractor for the purpose of extending the photometric capabilities of the observatory. A new photometer was constructed and first deployed in 1960. The telescope has a 300 mm diameter parabolic mirror and has a focal length of 5232 mm, yielding a speed of f/17.2.
The manufacturer of this instrument is not known.

Gibbs Heliochronometer
In 1906 astronomer and engineer George James Gibbs applied for a patent for what he called a "Universal Equinoctial Mean Time Heliochronometer",  basically a fancy sundial. In the same year he formed a partnership with Pilkington to sell the instrument as the Pilkington-Gibbs Heliochronometer.  About 1,000 were made. The instrument at Western is stamped No. 953. A cam device on the instrument takes into account the equation of time, thereby converting local solar time to within about a minute of mean solar time.

This instrument, along with a Ginkgo tree were presented to the university by the Arts Class of 1925, the first class to graduate from the newly finished University College building. The tree and heliochronometer were originally placed on the northeast lawn of University College. The heliochronometer was subsequently moved in front of Cronyn Observatory in 1952. After also being moved, the Ginkgo tree now thrives in its original location, turning a blazing yellow in about the first or second week of November.

Classroom
Building renovations of 1996 resulted in the replacement of the main floor foyer and two offices with a modern classroom that can seat approximately 70 people.

History rooms
For the celebration of the 75th anniversary in 2015, part of the basement of the observatory was converted into one 1940 historical period room and one science demonstration room. Since that time a 1967 Elginfield Observatory room as well as a William Colgrove historic workshop have been added. These are all open to the public during public events.

Research
While the observatory's prime vision was as an educational and outreach facility, some very important research publications came out of work done with the telescopes and other equipment at the observatory.

Variable stars
The important research work of William H. Wehlau, staff, and students could not be summarized better than the obituary written by Bill's last graduating PhD student, Professor Jaymie Matthews, when he wrote, after Bill's sudden death in 1995, "Bill laid the foundation  for  many  of the astronomical  period-searching  techniques  we take  for  granted  today. His  1964 paper  with  Kam-Ching  Leung  (ApJ  139,  843)  on  the  multiple  periods  of  Delta  Delphini  was  the  first  published  use  of  Fourier  integral  techniques  to  interpret  stellar  light  curves. The  quality  and  quantity  of  data  (25  nights  of  three-colour  photometry)  and  sophistication  of  the  fit  (a  sum  of  6  cosines)  would  not  be  out  of  place  in  the  modern  literature  on  asteroseismology  of  Delta Scuti  variables  (see his paper  in these  Proceedings). In  the  next  decade,  Bill  again  was  a  pioneer;  this  time  in  stellar  surface  imaging  through  inversion  of  spectral  line-profile  variations  into  abundance  and  temperature  maps  of  Ap  stars. By the  1980s, Bill's  diverse interests  in  pulsation  and  spectral  peculiarity  converged  in the  rapidly  oscillating Ap stars.

Iris Photometry
A locally modified Becker iris photometer was housed in the kitchenette in the basement of the observatory.
In 1964 Amelia F. Wehlau discovered a 1938 nova while using this photometer to study photographic plates of Messier 14 that had been taken by Helen Sawyer Hogg. The plates were taken with the 74" telescope at the David Dunlap Observatory and 72" telescope at the Dominion Astrophysical Observatory between the years 1932 and 1963. The nova was only found on the 1938 plates taken at the David Dunlap Observatory.

Photometry
A photometer was deployed on the 254 mm (10") refractor roughly between the years 1957 and 1960.
The first research from this instrument was the study of the brightness of Comet Arend-Roland by William and Amelia Wehlau, using data from 1957 and 1958. This combination of instruments was also used in the published search for variability in the stars Gamma Equulei and HD 149728, using 1958 and 1959 data from the refracting telescope.

In 1960 a 300 mm (12") Cassegrain reflector (purchased in 1958) came online with a locally built photometer, and this combination of equipment supplanted the photometer on the refractor.  The first published use was in the successful search for light variablility in the star HD 173650, published in 1962 and using data from the summer of 1960.
In later work using data from this instrument, William Wehlau pioneered Fourier techniques of detecting multiple periodicities in stars. The ground breaking work was the paper "The Multiple Periodicity of Delta Delphinii", Ap.J., Vol.139,April 1964, co-authored with graduate student Kam-Ching Leung.

Post 1969
With the opening of the Elginfield Observatory in 1969 the use of Cronyn Observatory for research observing diminished. The last photometric observations published using Cronyn Observatory data was in 1995 in a paper by J. Bax,  W.H. Wehlau and S. Sharpe.  However, very active machine and electronics shops based in Cronyn Observatory supported the research work of Elginfield Observatory until the 1.2m telescope at Elginfield was mothballed in 2010.

Public Outreach
The prime vision of this observatory was as an educational facility for the university and the local community.
Since its inception, Cronyn Observatory has held "public nights" for the community members, normally running every Saturday evening throughout the summer and currently also running twice a month throughout winter..  Large groups can also book a day or evening visit through the "Exploring the Stars Program", and finally private events for small groups are also available

See also
 List of astronomical observatories

References

Astronomical observatories in Canada
University of Western Ontario
Buildings and structures completed in 1940